NET may refer to:

Broadcast media

United States 
 National Educational Television, the predecessor of the Public Broadcasting Service (PBS) in the United States
 National Empowerment Television, a politically conservative cable TV network, now defunct, also known as "America's Voice"
 Nebraska Educational Telecommunications, a state network of Television (PBS) and Radio Stations (NPR) in Nebraska, United States
 New Evangelization Television, a Christian-oriented TV channel based in New York, United States

Other places 
 NET (telecommunications), a Brazilian cable television operator
 NET (Indonesian TV network), an Indonesian television network
 NET (Maltese TV channel), a Maltese television station
 NET 5, a Dutch television station
 New Hellenic Television, a Greek television network
 Nihon Educational Television, former name of TV Asahi

Science and technology 
 Noise-equivalent target, a measurement of radiant intensity used in detection systems
 Noise-equivalent temperature, a measure of the sensitivity of a thermal-radiation detector

Medicine and chemistry 
 N-Ethyltryptamine, a psychedelic drug
 Neuroendocrine tumor, a tumor occurring at the interface between the endocrine and nervous systems
 Neutrophil extracellular traps, networks of extracellular fibers that bind pathogens
 Norepinephrine transporter, a type of neurotransmitter transporter
 Norethisterone (norethindrone), a steroid contraceptive

Other uses 
 Cloudflare, American internet services company (stock ticker)
 NCAA Evaluation Tool, a metric created in 2018 for use in the college basketball tournament selection process
 National Education Trust, a UK non-profit charity
 National Eligibility Test, an Indian entrance examination
 Native English-speaking Teacher, a scheme designed to employ overseas teachers in Hong Kong
 Netherlands, UNDP country code
 New Earth Time, a naming system for time on Earth
 New English Translation, a 2005 English translation of the Bible
 Nigerian Entertainment Today, a newspaper
 No Electronic Theft Act, a 1997 United States law extending the grounds for prosecution of copyright infringement
 Nottingham Express Transit, a tramway system in Nottingham, England
 Narrative exposure therapy, used for the treatment of post-traumatic stress disorder
 Abbreviation for: No earlier than

See also 
 Net (disambiguation)
 NETS (disambiguation)
 NETD (disambiguation)
 .net (disambiguation)
 The Net (disambiguation)